Slamet Sampurno (born 19 March 1981) is an Indonesian footballer who plays for Persik Kediri in the Liga 2 as a defender. He is also a former player of Persibo Bojonegoro in 2009–10 Liga Indonesia Premier Division.

References

External links

Slamet Sampurno goal.com

1981 births
Living people
Indonesian footballers
Persik Kediri players
Persewangi Banyuwangi players
Persibo Bojonegoro players
PSIM Yogyakarta players
Persiba Balikpapan players
Association football defenders